Richard Hoad (born: 24 October 1930) is a sailor from Barbados, who represented his country at the 1992 Summer Olympics in Barcelona, Spain as helmsman in the Soling. With crew members David Staples and Jason Teller they took the 22nd place.

References

1930 births
Living people
Sailors at the 1992 Summer Olympics – Soling
Olympic sailors of Barbados
Barbadian male sailors (sport)